Potentilla alchemilloides, the alchemilla-leaved cinquefoil, is a species of cinquefoil (genus Potentilla) native to the Pyrenees. 

It is an upright herbaceous perennial plant reaching 30 cm tall, with palmate leaves with 5-7 leaflets. The flowers are white, with five petals.

References

External links

alchemilloides
Flora of the Pyrenees